Dave Benning (born 3 November 1969) is an English-born Canadian former player, head coach, and Canadian Soccer Association Technical Programs Manager.  

Benning worked in the Canadian Professional Soccer League with Vaughan Shooters as a player and manager from 1998 to 2003. He was active as a player in 1998 in the club's inaugural season in the CPSL. In their debut season he helped secure a postseason berth by finishing third in the overall standings. He featured in the playoffs against St. Catharines Wolves, but were eliminated by a score of 5-2 on goals on aggregate.  The following season, he was appointed assistant coach of the Glen Shields Soccer Club in the club's first season in 1998. In 1999, he succeeded coach Ron Harrison and continued as head coach until he retired in 2003.  On 28 November 2003 he was appointed by the Canadian Soccer Association as the Technical Programs Manager.

References

External links 
 

1969 births
Living people
Canadian soccer coaches
Soccer people from Ontario
Canadian Soccer League (1998–present) players
Canadian Soccer League (1998–present) managers
Footballers from Wolverhampton
York Region Shooters players
Association footballers not categorized by position
Canadian soccer players